Erwin Spiegel (born 3 October 1956) is an Austrian football manager.

References

1956 births
Living people
Austrian footballers
LASK players
Austrian football managers
LASK managers
FC Blau-Weiß Linz managers
FC Juniors OÖ managers
Association footballers not categorized by position